Allan Picken (born 7 September 1981 in New South Wales, Sydney) is an Australian footballer.

Biography
Picken started his career at Sydney FC playing in the youth team but moved to Newcastle Jets after then manager Richard Money signed him. On 31 July 2006, Picken moved to England to once again link up with manager Richard Money who paid for A$50,000 (£20,390) for the defender's services. He only managed two appearances for the Saddlers due to a long-term knee problem aggravated by playing and making his debut against Rochdale on the opening day of the 2006–2007 season in which Walsall won 1-0 thanks to a Martin Butler goal. Picken's Walsall contract was ended in April 2007, three months before it was due to expire. Picken moved back to Australia to fully recover from his knee problem.

References

1981 births
Living people
Sportsmen from New South Wales
Australian expatriate soccer players
A-League Men players
National Soccer League (Australia) players
Newcastle Jets FC players
Sydney United 58 FC players
Walsall F.C. players
Soccer players from Sydney
Association football defenders
Australian soccer players